Andrzej Bogucki (11 November 1904 – 29 July 1978) was a Polish television, stage and film actor, as well as operetta singer and songwriter, sometimes referred to as "The Polish Chevalier".

Bogucki and his wife Janina née Godlewska (8 March 1908 – 19 June 1992) are known for helping and hiding the Polish Jewish pianist Władysław Szpilman during the Nazi occupation of Poland. Szpilman's life inspired the 2002 film The Pianist, and both Bogucki and his wife were portrayed in the film.

Although he lived in Warsaw for most of his life, Bogucki also worked in several other cities. He lived in Warsaw's Mariensztat neighborhood from 1947 until the end of his life, and he is buried in the Powązki Cemetery in the western part of Warsaw.

Bogucki was awarded the Order of Polonia Restituta for his career and actions during World War II. In 1978 the Yad Vashem institute awarded him and his wife the Righteous Among the Nations award, an award given to non-Jewish people who helped Jews during the Nazi persecution.

Early life
Bogucki was born to a family with long-standing traditions in theatre and stage. His parents were the actors Stanisław Bogucki and Róża Bogucka-Rapacka. He was the grandson of the famous Polish actor and director Wincenty Rapacki.

Bogucki attended and graduated as a cavalry officer from the Officer's Cadet School in Grudziądz. While at school he participated in equestrian competitions and became an officer in the Polish Army. He served in the 7th Regiment Cavalry in Mińsk Mazowiecki, but was discharged for health reasons in 1929. In the same year, he began appearing in stage plays for children. From then on, he focused on his acting career.

World War II
During World War II, Bogucki and his wife were involved with the anti-Nazi Polish resistance movement, the Armia Krajowa (Home Army). In February 1944 they were contacted through members of the Jewish underground by their friend, the pianist Władysław Szpilman, who was working as a slave laborer as one of the remaining Jews in the Warsaw Ghetto. Anticipating that the Germans were planning to liquidate even the slave workers (most other Jews had already been deported to Treblinka), Szpilman, with help from Bogucki, escaped the ghetto and hid on the non-Jewish side of Warsaw. With help from Bogucki, Janina and others, Szpilman survived the war. His life was later the basis for the 2002 film The Pianist.

After the war, in the 1950s Szpilman composed songs especially for Andrzej and Janina, including the popular Czerwony autobus (Red bus).

Work

Theatre
Bogucki began working onstage on 30 April 1930. He performed at the Polish Theatre in Warsaw for three years between 1930 and 1933 and later worked at the New Comedy Theater between 1933 and 1934. He also worked for theaters in Łódź and Kraków.

After the end of World War II, he returned to the stage at the Polish Army Theatre in Łódź, where he performed between 1945 and 1947. He went on to work in several other theaters, including the National Theater, Warsaw, where he played from 1969 until his death in 1978.

Career as a singer
Bogucki began his singing career in 1931 at the Banda Theater, where he remained for a year until 1932. It was his distinctive singing voice that brought him most of his popularity.

After 1945, he continued to write songs and launched a number of hits in the radio.

He was a longtime employee of the Polish Radio. In addition, he worked with Radio Theatre of the Imagination (as a presenter, singer and reciter, and as a popularizer of music and literature).

Filmography
 1917 – Pokój nr 13, Tajemnica Alei Ujazdowskich, Wanda Barska, Tajemnica hotelu w Tajemnice Warszawy
 1933 – Jego ekscelencja subiekt (His Excellency, The Shop Assistant)
 1933 – Szpieg w masce
 1934 – Śluby ułańskie
 1935 – Manewry miłosne
 1936 – Pan Twardowski
 1936 – Bolek i Lolek
 1937 – Pan redaktor szaleje
 1937 – Niedorajda
 1938 – Za winy niepopełnione
 1939 – Złota Maska
 1939 - The Vagabonds
 1953 – Żołnierz zwycięstwa
 1953 – Sprawa do załatwienia
 1956 – Nikodem Dyzma
 1959 – Małpa w kąpieli
 1968 – Wniebowstąpienie
 1970 – Epilog norymberski
 1975 – Jej powrót
 1976 – Zagrożenie

Theatre on television
 1955 – Wesele
 1962 – Romantyczni
 1963 – Taniec księżniczki
 1963 – Syn marnotrawny
 1963 – Pan Benet
 1964 – Don Juan, czyli Kamienny gość
 1965 – Skąpiec
 1966 – Szwejk na tyłach
 1966 – Katarynka jako Radca
 1969 – Mieszczanin szlachcicem
 1970 – Dziewczęta z Nowolipek
 1972 – Zabezpieczenie macierzyństwa
 1972 – Elektra
 1973 – Norwid
 1974 – Twarz pokerzysty
 1975 – Emancypantki
 1976 – Jedenaste przykazanie
 1977 – Dyplomaci i sztabowcy w Przed burzą
 1978 – Filomena Marturano

Television films and series
 1965 – Ping-Pong w Perły i dukaty
 1968 – Stawka większa niż życie
 1973 – Wielka miłość Balzaka
 1973 – Janosik (TV series)
 1975 – Czterdziestolatek
 1977 – Noce i dnie (TV series)
 1977 – Lalka (TV series)
 1981 – Najdłuższa wojna nowoczesnej Europy

See also 
 List of recipients of the Order of Polonia Restituta

References

External links
 Andrzej Bogucki
 Andrzej Bogucki

1904 births
1978 deaths
Home Army members
Burials at Powązki Cemetery
Polish Army officers
Male actors from Warsaw
Polish male television actors
Polish male film actors
Polish male stage actors
Polish singer-songwriters
Commanders with Star of the Order of Polonia Restituta
Polish Righteous Among the Nations
Władysław Szpilman
20th-century Polish male actors
20th-century Polish male singers